The Reckoning is a British television drama starring Ashley Jensen and Max Beesley. It was broadcast in two parts by ITV on 18 and 19 April 2011.

Plot 
Sally Wilson, a single mother, has been bequeathed £5 million, but she must kill a man in order to get the money. Sally doesn't know what to do and confides in her ex-policeman boyfriend Mark, now a security guard.

Cast 
 Ashley Jensen as Sally Wilson
 Max Beesley as Mark Dobson

References

External links 

2011 British television series debuts
2011 British television series endings
2010s British drama television series
2010s British crime television series
ITV television dramas
2010s British television miniseries
Television series by ITV Studios
English-language television shows
Television shows set in London